Fort Resolution Airport  is located adjacent to Fort Resolution, Northwest Territories, Canada.

References

External links

Registered aerodromes in the South Slave Region